"Perdoname" is a song by Greek singer Demis Roussos from his 1975 album Souvenirs. It was also released as a single (in 1975 on Philips Records).

Background and writing
The song was written by Alec R. Costandinos, Mario Capuano, Giosy Capuano, and Mario Zelinotti. The recording was produced by Demis Roussos.

Commercial performance
The single reached no. 6 in the Netherlands and no. 5 in Belgium (Flanders).

Track listing
7" single Philips 6009 642 (1975, France, Portugal, etc.)
7" single RTB / Philips S 53897 (1975, Yugoslavia)
 A. "Perdoname" (2:59)
 B. "I'll Be Your Friend" (3:59)

7" single Philips 6042 015 (1975, Netherlands)
 A. "Perdoname" (3:01)
 B. "From Souvenirs To Souvenirs" (2:37)

Charts

Weekly charts

Year-end charts

References

External links

 Demis Roussos — "Perdoname" at Discogs

1975 songs
1975 singles
Demis Roussos songs
Philips Records singles
Songs written by Alec R. Costandinos
Song recordings produced by Demis Roussos